
Gmina Rzeczenica is a rural gmina (administrative district) in Człuchów County, Pomeranian Voivodeship, in northern Poland.

Villages
Gmina Rzeczenica contains the villages and settlements of Bagnica, Breńsk, Brzezie, Cierniki, Dzików, Garsk, Gockowo, Grodzisko, Gwieździn, Iwie, Jelnia, Jeziernik, Knieja, Lestnica, Łuszczyn, Międzybórz, Olszanowo, Pieniężnica, Przeręba, Przyrzecze, Rzeczenica, Sporysz, Trzmielewo, Zadębie, Zalesie and Zbysławiec.

Neighbouring gminas
Gmina Rzeczenica is bordered by the gminas of Biały Bór, Czarne, Człuchów, Koczała, Przechlewo and Szczecinek.

References
Polish official population figures 2006

Rzeczenica
Człuchów County